Santiago District is one of eight districts of the Cusco Province in Peru.

Geography 
Other mountains are listed below:

 Anka Wachana
 Araway Qhata
 Ichhu Urqu
 Muyu Urqu
 Ñustayuq
 Anahuarque
 Huanacaure

References

1955 establishments in Peru
States and territories established in 1955